Monahan, and close variants, is a name of Gaelic origin, derived from manachán, a diminutive of  , a monk. It may refer to:

Saints 

See Mainchín

People

Entertainment
Dan Monahan (born 1955), American actor
Darren Monahan, American Chief Information Officer and Producer, Obsidian Entertainment
David Monahan (born 1971), American actor
Gordon Monahan (born 1956), Canadian musician and composer
Matthew Monahan (born 1972), American artist based in Los Angeles
Meghan Monahan (born 2001), American artist
Pat Monahan (born 1969), American lead singer and songwriter for Train
Patrick Monahan (comedian) (born 1976), Irish-Iranian stand-up comedian
Sarah Monahan (born 1977), Australian actress
William Monahan (born 1960), American screenwriter

Sports
Garry Monahan (born 1946), retired Canadian professional ice hockey center
Hartland Monahan (born 1951), retired Canadian ice hockey player
Leo Monahan (journalist) (1926–2013), American sports journalist
Rinty Monahan (1928–2003), Major League Baseball pitcher
Sean Monahan (born 1994), Canadian professional ice hockey player
Shane Monahan (born 1974), former Major League Baseball outfielder and designated hitter
Shane Monahan (rugby union), Irish professional rugby union player

Other
Alfred Monahan (1877–1945), Anglican bishop of Monmouth
Brian Monahan, Attending physician of the United States Congress
Haven Monahan, the alleged perpetrator of the sexual assault in the now-retracted Rolling Stone article "A Rape on Campus" 
J. C. Monahan, American meteorologist and TV presenter
James G. Monahan (1855–1923), U.S. representative from Wisconsin
Jay Monahan (born 1970) The Commissioner of the PGA Tour
Patrick J. Monahan (born 1954), Dean of Osgoode Hall Law School of York University in Toronto,

See also 
Minogue
Monaghan (surname)

Notes and references

Citations

Primary sources

Secondary sources

 

Surnames of Irish origin